The Kettle Generating Station, also known as Kettle Rapids Generating Station, is a run-of-the-river hydroelectric power station on the Lower Nelson River in Manitoba, Canada. As part of the Nelson River Hydroelectric Project, the power station was completed in 1973 and the last generator commissioned in 1974.

Construction on the station began in the spring of 1966 and it was carried out in several phases. First, the power house was constructed after a circular coffer dam was set on the right side of the river. Second, the spillway was built adjacent and to the left of the power house while the river flowed through the power house in the meantime. Once the spillway was complete the entire the river was diverted through it. At this point, the turbines and generators were loaded into the power house and the earth-fill section on the dam's left bank was completed. The first generator was commissioned in December 1970 and seven generators were operational in June 1973 when the station was officially opened. The last generator was commissioned in November 1974.

The spillway covers 22 percent in the center of the dam and the earth-fill dam completes the remaining 35 percent in length. The power house contains twelve 102 MW propeller-type turbine-generators for an installed capacity of 1,220 MW.

See also

 List of largest power stations in Canada
 Long Spruce Generating Station – second dam downstream, completed in 1979
 Limestone Generating Station  – third dam downstream, completed in 1990

References

Dams completed in 1973
Energy infrastructure completed in 1973
Energy infrastructure completed in 1974
Dams in Manitoba
Hydroelectric power stations in Manitoba
Run-of-the-river power stations
Dams on the Nelson River